K.P.M. Trust is an educational trust established in 1972 to provide educational services in the Coimbatore region of India.

The trust runs the Rathinam College Technology Park and seven education institutions:
 Rathinam College of Arts and Science
 Rathinam Technical Campus
 Rathinam Institute of Management
 Rathinam School of Architecture
 Rathinam College of Physiotherapy
 KPM Matriculation Higher Secondary School
 KPM Primary School

The trust currently has about 2500 students attending these institutions.

References

 
 https://web.archive.org/web/20070928004359/http://www.rathinamcollege.com/aboutus.htm
 
 

Companies based in Coimbatore
Educational organisations based in India
1972 establishments in Tamil Nadu
Educational institutions established in 1972